Enavallen is a football stadium in Enköping, Sweden and the home stadium for the football team Enköpings SK. Enavallen has a total capacity of 4,500 spectators.

References 

Football venues in Sweden